The Rosborg witch trials took place at the Rosborg manor on Jylland in Denmark between 1639 and 1642. It became one of the more famed of the witch trials in Denmark. It was the first large witch trial in Denmark since the big Danish witch hunt of 1619-1632. 

The landowner and nobleman Niels Munk, owner of Rosborg manor, accused twelve people from the peasantry of having bewitched his children, who suffered from illnesses, and of having caused their ill health by use of witchcraft. The witch trial was managed by the landlord himself on his estate, where he had feudal rights to arrest, interrogate and judge people, and became an example of how a witch trial culd be conducted almost entirely by a single private person. The witch trial resulted in the prosecution of twelve people, the suicide of one person during imprisonment, and the execution of three people by burning at the stake.

References

 Marinus M. Schultz, Samlinger til jydsk historie og topografi, 1866, Publisher Aalborg

Witch trials in Denmark
1639 in Europe
17th century in Denmark
1640s in Denmark